Katrina Maree "Triny" Powell  (born 8 April 1972 in Canberra, Australian Capital Territory) is an Australian field hockey player. She represented Australia in three consecutive Summer Olympics, starting in 1996.

Powell was a member of the Australian Women's Hockey Team, known as the Hockeyroos, that won the gold medals at the 1996 and the 2000 Summer Olympics. Powell represented Australia 252 times, and scored 141 goals. She is the sister of Lisa Powell and the sister-in-law of Stuart Carruthers.

Powell was awarded the Medal of the Order of Australia (OAM) in the 1997 Australia Day Honours and the Australian Sports Medal in June 2000.

In March 2021, she was appointed Hockeyroos coach - the first female coach of the side in 43 years.

References

External links
 
 Australian Olympic Committee
 

1972 births
Living people
Australian female field hockey players
Field hockey players at the 1996 Summer Olympics
Field hockey players at the 2000 Summer Olympics
Field hockey players at the 2004 Summer Olympics
Olympic field hockey players of Australia
Olympic gold medalists for Australia
Commonwealth Games gold medallists for Australia
Commonwealth Games bronze medallists for Australia
Sportspeople from Canberra
Olympic medalists in field hockey
Medalists at the 2000 Summer Olympics
Medalists at the 1996 Summer Olympics
Commonwealth Games medallists in field hockey
ACT Academy of Sport alumni
Field hockey players at the 1998 Commonwealth Games
Field hockey players at the 2002 Commonwealth Games
Recipients of the Medal of the Order of Australia
Recipients of the Australian Sports Medal
Sportswomen from the Australian Capital Territory
Australian field hockey coaches
Coaches at the 2020 Summer Olympics
Medallists at the 1998 Commonwealth Games
Medallists at the 2002 Commonwealth Games